Common Clay is a 1930 American pre-Code film directed by Victor Fleming and starring Constance Bennett and Lew Ayres, based on the 1915 play of the same name by Cleves Kinkead which starred Jane Cowl. 

The film is about a young servant who is seduced by the master of the house who will having nothing else to do with her besides sex because she is of an inferior class. She becomes pregnant and seeks to have the child recognized but his family treats her as if she were a blackmailer.

Cast
Constance Bennett as Ellen Neal
Lew Ayres as Hugh Fullerton
Tully Marshall as W.H. Yates
Matty Kemp as Arthur Coakley
Purnell Pratt as Richard Fullerton
Beryl Mercer as Mrs. Neal
Charles McNaughton as Edwards
Hale Hamilton as Judge Samuel Filson
Genevieve Blinn as Mrs. Fullerton

Trivia

Common Clay was one of the top ten highest-grossing films of 1930, and that financial success made Constance Bennett into a Hollywood star.

A previous version of the play had been filmed in 1919 as a silent movie by director George Fitzmaurice and starring Fannie Ward. It is now lost.

References

External links

Synopsis: Common Clay, allmovie.com; accessed February 10, 2016.

American films based on plays
Films directed by Victor Fleming
American black-and-white films
1930 drama films
1930 films
Films with screenplays by Jules Furthman
Fox Film films
American drama films
1930s English-language films
1930s American films